Mosese Moala (born 14 June 1978 in Tonga) was a Tongan rugby union player. His playing position was prop. He was called up to represent Tonga in the 2007 Rugby World Cup, but withdrew through injury during the tournament without making any appearances.

Reference list

External links
itsrugby.co.uk profile
Rugby World Cup profile

1978 births
Tongan rugby union players
Tonga international rugby union players
Living people
Rugby union props
Tongan expatriate rugby union players
Tongan expatriate sportspeople in France
Expatriate rugby union players in France